Bryonia is a genus of flowering plants in the gourd family. Bryony  is its best-known common name. They are native to western Eurasia and adjacent regions, such as North Africa, the Canary Islands and South Asia.

Description and ecology

Bryonies are perennial, tendril-climbing, diclinous or dioecious herbs with palmately lobed leaves and flowers in axillary clusters. The fruit is a smooth, globular berry.

Bryonia is used as a food plant by the larvae of some Lepidoptera (butterflies and moths), including the tortrix moth Phtheochroa rugosana (recorded on red bryony, B. dioica) and the cabbage moth (Mamestra brassicae). The horticultural value contributes to formation of pest and crop damage by the food plant consumption.

Use by humans
Bryonies are occasionally grown in gardens, sometimes accidentally, sometimes deliberately so. Some species find use in herbal medicine. Generally however, these plants are poisonous, some highly so, and may be fatal if ingested. Cucurbitacin glycosides are primarily responsible for the plants' bitterness and emetic effects.

Variants of the plants' name, such as Briony, Bryonie and Bryony, are used in some cultures as female given names.  They were quite popular in the 18th century.

The Royal Navy of the United Kingdom named two ships HMS Bryony after the plant.

Species

Twelve species are currently accepted by the USDA:
Ten of these are supported in a molecular-phylogenetic analysis:
The only English species, B. dioica (white bryony), grows in hedgerows as far north as Yorkshire.

 Bryonia acuta Desf. (formerly sometimes included in B. cretica)
 Bryonia alba L. – white bryony
 Bryonia aspera Steven ex Ledeb.
 Bryonia cretica L. – Cretan bryony
 Bryonia dioica Jacq. – white or red bryony (formerly sometimes included in B. cretica)
 Bryonia lappifolia Vassilcz.
 Bryonia marmorata E.M.A.Petit
 Bryonia melanocarpa Nabiev
 Bryonia monoica Aitch. & Hemsl.
 Bryonia multiflora Boiss. & Heldr.
 Bryonia syriaca Boiss.
 Bryonia verrucosa Aiton

Formerly placed here
 Many species of Cayaponia ("American bryonies")
 Several species of Cucumis, Solena and Zehneria
 Coccinia abyssinica
 Corallocarpus epigaeus
 Diplocyclos palmatus
 Kedrostis africana
 Melothria pendula (as B. guadalupensis)
 Trichosanthes ovigera (as B. cucumeroides)

See also
 Bryonopsis (meaning "looks like bryony"), a now-invalid genus currently assigned to close (Diplocyclos) and somewhat more distant (Kedrostis) relatives of Bryonia

Footnotes

References
  (2009): Siren SOS Germplasm Resources Information Network – Bryonia. Version of 2009-MAY-15. Retrieved 2010-APR-15.
  2009. Phylogeography of the ancient Eurasian medicinal plant genus Bryonia (Cucurbitaceae) inferred from nuclear and chloroplast sequences. Taxon 58(2): 550-560.
  Dioscorides's Bruonia melaina is Bryonia alba, not Tamus communis, and an illustration labeled Bruonia melaina in the Codex Vindobonensis is Humulus lupulus not Bryonia dioica. pp. 273–280. In: Pitrat, M., ed., Cucurbitaceae 2008, https://w3.avignon.inra.fr/dspace/handle/2174/218

External links 

 Medicinal uses of Bryonia alba - Note: This is a historical document from the 1930s and may not be medically accurate today.
 Bryonia cretica Flowers in Israel

Cucurbitoideae
Cucurbitaceae genera
Medicinal plants
Dioecious plants
Poisonous plants